Organization of Russian Young Pathfinders may refer to

 Organization of Russian Young Pathfinders (Russia), a Russian Scouting organization
 Organization of Russian Young Pathfinders (Scouts-in-Exile), a Scouts-in-Exile organizations